The table shows a comparison of functional programming languages which compares various features and designs of different functional programming languages.

References 

 
Functional programming languages